The BBC Sports Personality of the Year Award is the main award of the BBC Sports Personality of the Year ceremony, which takes place each December. The winner is the sportsperson, judged by a public vote, to have achieved the most that year. The recipient must either be British or reside and play a significant amount of their sport in the United Kingdom. The winner is selected from a pre-determined shortlist. The most recent award-winner is footballer Beth Mead, who won the 2022 award.

History 
Sports Personality of the Year was created by Paul Fox, who thought of the idea while he was editor of the magazine show Sportsview. The first award ceremony took place in 1954 as part of Sportsview, and was presented by Peter Dimmock. For the first show, votes were sent by postcard, and rules presented in a Radio Times article stipulated that nominations were restricted to athletes who had featured on the Sportsview programme since April. Approximately 14,500 votes were cast, and Christopher Chataway beat Roger Bannister to win the inaugural BBC Sportsview's Personality of the Year Award.

Nomination procedure 
The shortlist is announced a few weeks before the award ceremony, and the winner is determined on the night by a public telephone and on-line vote. Prior to 2012, a panel of 30 sports journalists each submitted a list of 10 contenders. From these contenders a shortlist of ten nominees was determined. This method was criticized following the selection of an all-male shortlist in 2011. The selection process for contenders was changed for the 2012 and subsequent awards by the introduction of an expert panel. The panel produces a shortlist that reflects UK sporting achievements on the national and/or international stage, represents the breadth and depth of UK sports and takes into account 'impact' within and beyond the sport or sporting achievement in question.

Winners
Five people have won the award more than once: tennis player Andy Murray is the only person to have won three times (in addition to the Young Sports Personality and Team awards), while boxer Henry Cooper and Formula One drivers Nigel Mansell, Lewis Hamilton and Damon Hill have each won twice. Hamilton also holds the record for the highest number of top three placements with six. Eight people have twice finished second without ever winning, including Bobby Charlton and Sally Gunnell (Gunnell also finished third once). Jessica Ennis-Hill holds the record for most top three placements without a win; having finished second once and third three times. Both Charlton (2008) and Ennis-Hill (2017), received the BBC Sports Personality of the Year Lifetime Achievement Award.

Princess Anne (1971) and her daughter Zara Phillips (2006) are the only award-winners to be members of the same family. The oldest recipient of the award is Dai Rees, who won in 1957 aged 44. Ian Black, who won the following year, aged 17, is the youngest winner. Torvill and Dean, who won in 1984, are the only non-individual winners of the award, so in the 66 years of the award there have been 67 recipients. Of these 14 have been female. 17 sporting disciplines have been represented; athletics has the highest representation, with 17 recipients. Counting Torvill and Dean separately, there have been 48 English winners of the award, six Scottish, five Welsh, three Northern Irish, and one Manx. Since the award ceremony began only on one occasion (2013) have none of the podium placers been English. On three occasions a sportsman from outside the United Kingdom has made the podium, on each occasion for sporting success achieved in Great Britain; New Zealand speedway star Barry Briggs (1964 and 1966) and Italian jockey Frankie Dettori (1996). Barry McGuigan, Greg Rusedski and Lennox Lewis originally competed for Ireland (McGuigan) and Canada (Rusedski and Lewis) respectively, but had completed their transfer of allegiance to Great Britain by the time of their awards.

Awards by year

By sport 
This table lists the total number of awards won by the winner's sport.

Accurate up-to and including the 2022 award.

By number of awards
The below table lists all people who have finished in the top three places more than once.

By nationality

By gender 
This table lists the total number of awards won by the winner's gender. The figure-skating couple Jayne Torvill and Christopher Dean are counted as a single mixed-gender winner.

Accurate up-to and including the 2022 award.

See also
History of BBC Sports Personality of the Year

Notes

References

General

Specific

BBC Sports Personality of the Year awards
Awards established in 1954
1954 establishments in the United Kingdom
United Kingdom